JS Fuyushio (SS-588) was the sixth ship of the submarine of Japan Maritime Self-Defense Force.

Development and design 

This type is a teardrop type ship type, a so-called SSS (Single Screw Submarine) type with a single-axis propulsion system, and the structural style is a complete double-shell structure, following the method since the Uzushio-class (42SS) in the basic design concept . Meanwhile, the type, dual vibration-damping support of the anti-vibration support or main engine of the main motor, the auxiliary equipment and pipe systems, static power supply, and rectification of the hole opening on the bottom of the ship. Through these efforts, it was decided that the masker sound insulation device was unnecessary, and in the latter model of this model, it was so quiet that it would not be detected even if snorkeling was continued until the sonobuoy was visible.

Construction and career 
Fuyushio was laid down at Kawasaki Heavy Industries Kobe Shipyard on 12 December 1991 as the 1990 plan 2400-ton submarine No. 8103 and it was launched on 16 February 1994. She was commissioned on 7 March 1995 and homeported in Kure. She belonged to the 1st Submarine of the 6th Submarine Group.

Participated in RIMPAC 1996 from 27 August to 28 November.

On March 12, 1997, the 6th Submarine was renamed the 3rd Submarine due to the revision of the unit number.

2011 March 15 , Sōryū-class submarines JS Hakuryū type changed ship citizenship number to practice submarine with the commissioning of the TSS-3607 change. It was transferred to the 1st training submarine under the direct control of the submarine fleet. At this time, the torpedoes were landed and the torpedo launcher room was renovated by arranging a trainee auditorium.

From 20 to 28 September 2013, participated in the joint military exercise Pacific Reach 2013 sponsored by the Maritime Self-Defense Force.

She was decommissioned on 6 March 2015 and scrapped in Etajima in April 2016.

Gallery

Citations

External links

Ships built by Kawasaki Heavy Industries
1994 ships
Harushio-class submarines
Training ships of the Japan Maritime Self-Defense Force